Dalbergia suaresensis is a species of legume in the family Fabaceae, and is unique because it is only found in Madagascar. The plant's conservation status is listed as "endangered", and its continued existence on this planet is threatened by habitat loss.

References

suaresensis
Endemic flora of Madagascar
Endangered plants
Taxonomy articles created by Polbot
Taxa named by Henri Ernest Baillon